Xiao Qingdao (Chinese: 小青岛; other name: Qin Dao) is an island in Qingdao, China. It is located in the southeast of Zhan Qiao pier.

Xiao Qingdao was a restricted military area until 1987. During the German occupation in 1900, they named "Qingdao" for their leased territory, and built a lighthouse on Xiao Qingdao island. After 1914, the Japanese attacked Jiaozhou Bay and occupied it, and afterwards they renamed Xiao Qingdao to "Kato Island".
Local people named this island "Xiao Qingdao" because it is a small island. "Xiao" means small in Chinese. The area of Xiao Qingdao is 0.024 square kilometers and 17 meters above sea level. Also they called it "Qin Dao" because the shape of the island looks like an ancient musical instrument.

References
 小青岛 青岛新闻网 2011-05-04.
 Former Foreign Colonies and Concessions in China

Tourist attractions in Qingdao
Islands of Shandong
Islands of the Yellow Sea